Paulius Dambrauskas (born 16 December 1991) is a Lithuanian basketball player who last played for Astoria Bydgoszcz of the Polish Basketball League.

Professional career
In 2010, Dambrauskas signed a long-term contract with BC Lietuvos Rytas. In the 2012–13 season BC Sakalai loaned Dambrauskas from Lietuvos Rytas. In February he suffered a shoulder injury and was not able to play for 4 months.

After recovering from the injury he started the 2013–14 season with Lietuvos Rytas, but later that year was loaned to BC Dzūkija. In the 2013–14 season he also started in Lietuvos Rytas, but once again later that year was loaned to BC Dzūkija. From 2015 August he played for BC Šiauliai.
In 2016-17 Dambrauskas played in Maurienne Savoie Basket, and for the first time in his career outside Lithuania.

On June 28, 2019, he signed with Stal Ostrów Wielkopolski of the Polish Basketball League. Dambrauskas averaged 12.8 points, 4.5 rebounds and 2.5 assists per game.

On September 14, 2020, he has signed with Astoria Bydgoszcz of the Polish Basketball League.

References 

1991 births
Living people
Aix Maurienne Savoie Basket players
Astoria Bydgoszcz players
BC Dzūkija players
BC Neptūnas players
BC Rytas players
BC Šiauliai players
Lithuanian men's basketball players
MKS Dąbrowa Górnicza (basketball) players
Point guards